Dalbec is a folk hero from traditional Quebec folklore. Some tales of Dalbec were published by the folklorist William Parker Greenough in Canadian Folk-Life and Folk-Lore (1897).

According to Greenough, he heard several folktales (or contes, as they were called) involving Dalbec, as told by a French-Canadian raconteur (storyteller), a guide named Nazaire. Dalbec was a hunter, and his adventures are invariably outlandish and concern amazing feats involving overpowering animals:

Along with Ti-Jean and the voyageur-hero Jean Cadieux, Dalbec is one of the most well-known characters of Quebec folklore.

See also
Canadian folklore

References

Canadian folklore
Culture of Quebec